The following is the official canvassing of votes by the Congress of the Philippines for the 1953 Philippine presidential election.

Presidential election

Vice presidential election

References 

1953 in the Philippines